The Chacao Channel is located in Los Lagos Region, Chile and separates Chiloé Island from mainland Chile. The channel was created during the Quaternary glaciations by successive glaciers that flowed down from the Andes to the coast. The construction of a bridge connecting the island with the continent was discussed at government level for some time, but during the first government of Michelle Bachelet (2006–2010) it was turned down due to its high cost in comparison with other proposals that could be done to benefit islanders. Later, it was reactivated during Sebastián Piñera government, and finally auctioned

The channel connects the Pacific Ocean and Gulf of Ancud.

A single-circuit 220 kV-powerline with a span-length of 2682 metres crosses the Chacao Channel, erected in 1995. The towers of each end of this span are 179 metres tall.

See also
 Fjords and channels of Chile
 Roca Remolino

References

Straits of Chile
Chiloé Archipelago
Coasts of Los Lagos Region
Bodies of water of Los Lagos Region